Sanxi (<!—see MOS:ZH-->) is a town in Yangxin County, Hubei, China. It is surrounded by Yinzu Town of Daye City on the north, Wangying Town on the west, Futu Town on the east, and Military Reclamation State Farm on the south.

Etymology
Sanxi means three streams. It is named Sanxi because Wangying Stream, Daye Stream, and Guohe Stream meet in the town.

History
It was incorporated as a town in the Jiajing period (1522–1566) of the Ming dynasty (1368–1644). It was called Sanxikou Town in the Ming dynasty. In the Qing dynasty (1644–1911), it was renamed "Sanxikou City". In 1935, it was the district seat of the Third District. In 1952, it came under the jurisdiction of the Seventh District. It was renamed "Sanxi Commune" in 1958 and was renamed "Sanxi District" in 1961.

Administrative division
The town is divided into one community and fifteen villages: 
 Sanxikou Community 
 Longquan 
 Shangyu 
 Guankuang 
 Baishu 
 Junlin 
 Jiangfu 
 Gaoqiao 
 Cahnghe 
 Yaji 
 Hengshan 
 Lizhong 
 Baxiang 
 Zhulin 
 Huangchong 
 Sanxikou

Geography

Wangying Stream, Daye Stream, and Guohe Stream flow through the town.

The town is in the subtropical monsoon climate zone.

Economy
The town's agriculture is mainly rice, corn and vegetables.

The town is rich in manganese, coal, limestone, calcite, crystal stone, and marble.

Transport
G45 Daqing–Guangzhou Expressway passes across the town north to south.

Provincial Highway S317 travels through the town.

Attractions
Sanjiaoshan is a Buddhist temple in the town.

Notable people
, Ming dynasty writer.
 Wu Fusheng, Qing dynasty politician.
 Pan Guangzao, Qing dynasty politician.
 Wang Bochao, a legendary soldier during the Republic of China.

References

Towns in China
Divisions of Yangxin County, Hubei